MC Luscious (born Rosalyn McCall) is an American bass music recording artist from Miami, Florida.

Discography

Albums 
 Boom! (1989/1991)
 Back to Boom (1993) 
 Lollypop (1995)

Singles 
 "Da' Dip"
 "Boom! I Got Your Boyfriend"

Charts

Albums 
1992  Boom!  Heatseekers  28

Singles 
1997  "Da Dip"  Hot R&B/Hip-Hop Singles & Tracks  63
1997  "Da Dip"  Hot Rap Singles  16  
1997  "Da Dip"  Billboard Hot 100  82
1997  "Da' Dip"  Hot R&B/Hip-Hop Singles & Tracks  67  
1997  "Da' Dip"  Hot Rap Singles  15  
1997  "Da' Dip"  Billboard Hot 100  87  
1992  "Boom! I Got Your Boyfriend"  Hot R&B/Hip-Hop Singles & Tracks  78  
1992  "Boom! I Got Your Boyfriend"  The Billboard Hot 100  61

References 

American hip hop musicians
Living people
Year of birth missing (living people)